In music, the Cologne School is a loosely associated group of composers and performers of the generation that came to prominence in the 1970s, who lived and worked in the city of Cologne, Germany.

Composers

There is some disagreement about how to define the school and who its central figures are. One of the earliest writers on the Cologne School observed that a large proportion are foreigners, and chose to focus on seven non-German composers as representative: Ladislav Kupkovič from Slovakia, Péter Eötvös from Hungary,  from Bulgaria, Daniel Chorzempa and John McGuire, both from the United States, Mesías Maiguashca from Ecuador, and Clarence Barlow from India.

Seventeen years later, another writer identifies Barlow and three other composers, Gerald Barry (Ireland), Kevin Volans (South Africa), and Walter Zimmermann (Germany) as the central figures in the first wave of the group, and sees Stockhausen, Kagel, the Hochschule, and the Westdeutscher Rundfunk (through its electronic music studio, new-music concert series, commissioning of new music, and its commitment to innovative programme-making both in TV and radio) as the key agents that produced this group. According to this view, later important arrivals included Chris Newman, Claude Vivier, and John McGuire, but their approaches were in many ways at odds with the aesthetic of the earlier group.

Performers
One performer particularly associated with the Cologne School is the pianist

Organisations
Several institutions founded in Cologne in the late 1960s and 1970s are associated with the Cologne-School composers. These include the Gruppe 8 (York Höller, Rolf Riehm, and Bojidar Dimov), founded in early 1969 and disbanded in August 1972, Feedback Studio (Johannes Fritsch, David C. Johnson, and Rolf Gehlhaar), founded in 1970, the Beginner-Studio (Walter Zimmermann), founded 1977, and the Oeldorf Group (Péter Eötvös, Mesías Maiguashca, and Joachim Krist, together with the cellist Gaby Schumacher), founded 1972 and active until 1979.

Related ideas
A related term, Cologne School of Electronic Music, is sometimes applied to the previous generation of composers who worked mainly in the electronic music studio of the Westdeutscher Rundfunk in the 1950s and 1960s, including Karlheinz Stockhausen.

References

Cited sources

Further reading
 Fitzgerald, Mark. 2009. "New Music, Early Music, Recent Music: The Cologne Sound Palette in the Late 1970s". Musicologica Olomucensia 10:11–26.
 Gottstein, Björn. 2006. "Mythos 'Kölner Schule'". In Neue Musik aus Deutschland—Rückblick. Goethe Institut, Online-Redaktion (archive from 10 November 2013, accessed 1 January 2017).
 Kurtz, Michael. 1992. Stockhausen: A Biography, translated by Richard Toop. London and Boston: Faber and Faber.  (cloth)  (pbk).

Composition schools
Culture in Cologne
History of Cologne
Music organisations based in Germany